Brenda Maymon-Jensen (born June 4, 1985) is an American Paralympic sitting volleyball player. She is part of the United States women's national sitting volleyball team.

She competed at the 2004 Summer Paralympics, and 2012 Summer Paralympics winning the gold medal.

See also
 United States at the 2012 Summer Paralympics

References

External links
Ed Murray, NEWS 9 UCO Hosts World's Sitting Volleyball Championships, July 13, 2010
Brenda Maymon and Heather Erickson Photos, Paralympics Day 6 - Volleyball: Sitting
Brenda Maymon (3) serves for the USA , The Oklahoman December 7 photo gallery
Brenda Maymon, Getty Images

1985 births
Living people
Volleyball players at the 2012 Summer Paralympics
Paralympic volleyball players of the United States
American sportswomen
American sitting volleyball players
Women's sitting volleyball players
Medalists at the 2008 Summer Paralympics
Medalists at the 2004 Summer Paralympics
Medalists at the 2012 Summer Paralympics
Paralympic medalists in volleyball
Paralympic silver medalists for the United States
Paralympic bronze medalists for the United States
21st-century American women